Andres or Andrés may refer to:

Andres, Illinois, an unincorporated community in Will County, Illinois, US
Andres, Pas-de-Calais, a commune in Pas-de-Calais, France
Andres (name)
Hurricane Andres
"Andres" (song), a 1994 song by L7

See also

San Andrés (disambiguation), various places with the Spanish name of Saint Andrew
Anders (disambiguation)
Andre (disambiguation)
Andreas (disambiguation)